Bruno Bellone (born 14 March 1962) is a former French international footballer who played as a winger, and who earned 34 caps and scored two goals for France from 1981 to 1988. One of the goals was in the final of the 1984 European Championships, where France defeated Spain 2–0 to win the title. He was also in France's 1982 and 1986 World Cup squads.

Career
It was the quarter-final match against Brazil in 1986 for which he will most be remembered, for two incidents. Firstly, as the end of extra-time approached, he had a clear opportunity to score the winning goal, as he rounded Brazil goalkeeper Carlos on the edge of the penalty area. He was blocked by Carlos as he went past him, thus knocking him off balance and preventing him to reach the ball in time to score. The referee did not give a foul. In the penalty shoot-out, Bellone took France's third kick. The ball hit the post and rebounded onto Carlos and then back into the goal. Despite Brazilian protests, the goal was allowed to stand. France manager Henri Michel, confronted after the game with the possibility that Bellone's penalty should not have stood, pointed to the Carlos incident in open play and said "There was a certain justice in that". The laws of football were later clarified in favour of the referee's decision.

Personal life
Bellone had to retire from football at the age of 28, following an ankle injury. He then suffered a series of personal setbacks, losing his savings in ill-fated investments. In 1998, Radio France wrongly reported that he had died. Bellone was able to pay off his debts in 1999, after a gala match was organised in his honour in Cannes. Since 2007, he has been working as a sports technical advisor for the commune of Le Cannet. He is a father of four.

Honours
Monaco
Division: 1981–82
Coupe de France: 1984–85
France
UEFA European Championship: 1984
Artemio Franchi Cup: 1985

References

External links
 
 
 
 

1962 births
Living people
French people of Italian descent
Sportspeople from Toulon
French footballers
Footballers from Provence-Alpes-Côte d'Azur
French beach soccer players
Association football forwards
France international footballers
1982 FIFA World Cup players
UEFA Euro 1984 players
1986 FIFA World Cup players
UEFA European Championship-winning players
Ligue 1 players
Ligue 2 players
ES Cannet Rocheville players
AS Monaco FC players
AS Cannes players
Montpellier HSC players